Olayakunnam is a village in the Pattukkottai taluk of Thanjavur district, Tamil Nadu, India.

Demographics 

As per the 2001 census, Olayakunnam had a total population of 1417 with 736 males and 735 females. The sex ratio was 999. The literacy rate was 58.45.

References 

 

Villages in Thanjavur district